Admiral Duncan may refer to:

Admiral Adam Duncan, 1st Viscount Duncan (1731–1804), British Royal Navy admiral
Admiral Duncan (pub), London pub, named after Admiral Adam Duncan
Admiral Charles K. Duncan (1911–1994), U.S. Navy admiral
Admiral Donald B. Duncan (1896–1975), U.S. Navy admiral